Noemiamea dolioliformis is a species of sea snail, a marine gastropod mollusk in the family Pyramidellidae, the pyrams and their allies.

Description
The shell grows to a length of 2.3 mm.

Distribution
This species occurs in the following locations:
 European waters (ERMS scope) (North Sea)
 Portuguese Exclusive Economic Zone
 Spanish Exclusive Economic Zone
 United Kingdom Exclusive Economic Zone
 the Canaries
 the Mediterranean Sea

References

External links
 To CLEMAM
 To Encyclopedia of Life
 To GenBank
 To Marine Species Identification Portal
 To World Register of Marine Species
 

Pyramidellidae
Gastropods described in 1848